Brad Spencer (born 16 May 1996) is a Scottish professional footballer who plays as a midfielder for Raith Rovers in the Scottish Championship.

Career
After spending his youth career with Houston Dynamo, Spencer signed for Scottish top division side Kilmarnock in the summer of 2017 but was released a year later without making a first team appearance. He moved down to Scottish League One club Dumbarton where he made no great impact, but after switching to fellow third tier part-timers Forfar Athletic in January 2019 he became an important member of the team which finished second and took part in the Championship play-offs, although they were eliminated by Raith Rovers (who also failed in their efforts to move up a level). 

Spencer then returned to full-time football when he signed for Raith a short time later, and having quickly agreed an extension to his initial one-year contract,  went on to play a role in their 2019–20 Scottish League One title win and promotion. After missing most of the pre-season with a knee injury, his debut in the Scottish Championship (which was delayed and shortened by the COVID-19 pandemic in Scotland, in addition to the previous campaign being ended early) came in October 2020 when he came off the bench in the first half and provided an assist in a 5–2 win over Queen of the South.

Personal life
He is the son of former Scotland striker John Spencer. As a result of his father's career path, Brad was born in London and spent some of his childhood living in southern England and the United States.

Honours
 Raith Rovers
 Scottish League One : 2019-20
Scottish Challenge Cup : 2021-22

References

External links
B. Spencer at Soccerway

British expatriate sportspeople in the United States
Expatriate soccer players in the United States
Footballers from Greater London
Scottish expatriate footballers
Anglo-Scots
1996 births
Living people
Scottish footballers
Raith Rovers F.C. players
Forfar Athletic F.C. players
Dumbarton F.C. players
Kilmarnock F.C. players
Association football midfielders